Juliette "Juju" Castaneda (nickname Juju C.; pen name Juliet C.; born March 21, 1981) is an American media personality, author, actress and businesswoman. She rose to prominence as a main cast member of the VH1 reality television series Love & Hip Hop: New York and she subsequently appeared as a supporting cast member on its spin-off show, Love & Hip Hop: Miami. Castaneda released her debut novel, Secrets of a Jewel, in January 2017.

Career
In 2012, Castaneda was reportedly approached by Mona Scott-Young to appear as a cast member on the third season of VH1's reality television series Love & Hip Hop: New York, but she turned it down. In April 2014, Castaneda was featured on rapper Cam'ron's track "Devil" and the song was later included in the extended play, 1st of the Month Vol. 3. She made her New York Fashion Week debut in the fall of 2014, walking for Mark McNairy.

In December 2016, Castaneda joined the supporting cast of the seventh season of Love & Hip Hop: New York after previously making an uncredited cameo in season 6. This season chronicled the launch of her debut novel Secrets of a Jewel. She was later promoted to the main cast for the eighth and ninth seasons of the show, which explored her adapting Secrets of a Jewel into a play, and her business ventures with fellow cast members Safaree and Jonathan Fernandez. Castaneda returned to the show as a supporting cast member for the tenth season. Additionally, Castaneda made several appearances on the first season of Love & Hip Hop: Miami as a friend of Amara La Negra.

In 2019, Castaneda made her transition into acting after being cast in the thriller film Don't Shoot the Messenger. She also made a minor appearance in the crime comedy I Got the Hook-Up 2.

Personal life
Castaneda was born in Brooklyn, New York City. She was raised in Miami, Florida after her family relocated there shortly after her birth. Her parents are both Afro-Cuban immigrants who moved to the United States in 1980. She has an older brother, José Ernesto, and a sister, Jacquelyn, who is currently her manager. At the age of 16, Castaneda moved to Orlando and later worked as a security screener at Orlando International Airport. Castaneda attended Barry University, obtaining both a bachelor's degree in business and a master's degree in public administration. She is also a licensed real estate broker in Florida and the proprietor of a hair care and wig company, Candy Jewels Hair.

Castaneda is a fluent speaker of Spanish and English. She is a vegetarian.

After meeting rapper Cam'ron in 2002, the two began dating in 2007. The couple became engaged in 2013, but they later called off their engagement in 2017.

Activism
Castaneda is known for being outspoken about her Afro-Latina identity; she has been a proponent for addressing colorism and eurocentrism within the Latin community. She spoke out in support of Amara La Negra, who was criticised by another cast member for sporting an afro on the set of Love & Hip Hop: Miami. In 2018, she stated: 

In 2016, Castaneda established My Precious Jewels, a nonprofit organization to help adolescent girls with self-confidence and self-acceptance. In March 2019, she raised $200,000 to donate to an orphanage in Cuba.

Filmography

Film

Television

Bibliography
 Secrets of a Jewel (January 31, 2017)

References

External links

1981 births
21st-century American actresses
21st-century American novelists
21st-century American women writers
Actresses from New York City
American film actresses
American people of Caribbean descent
American people of Cuban descent
American women in business
American women novelists
American women television personalities
Barry University alumni
Businesspeople from Brooklyn
Businesspeople from New York City
Hispanic and Latino American actresses
Hispanic and Latino American women in the arts
Hispanic and Latino American novelists
Living people
Participants in American reality television series
Pseudonymous women writers
Television personalities from New York City
Writers from Brooklyn
21st-century pseudonymous writers